Carmen Rupe (10 October 1936 – 14 December 2011), was a New Zealand drag performer, brothel keeper, anti-discrimination activist, would-be politician and HIV/AIDS activist. Carmen Rupe was New Zealand's first drag queen to reach celebrity status. She was a trans woman.

Life
Born in Taumarunui, Rupe had twelve siblings. Her mother was of Ngāti Hāua and Ngāti Heke-a-Wai descent, while her father was of Ngāti Maniapoto. She relocated to the urban centres of Auckland and Wellington. After doing drag performances while doing compulsory military training and periods working as a nurse and waiter, Rupe moved to Sydney's Kings Cross in the late 1950s. In the 1970s, she became notorious for the sexually tolerant venues she established in Wellington, and was renowned as a matriarchal figure among local trans communities.

Taking the name of the Romani Flamenco dancer Carmen Amaya,  Rupe became Australia's first Māori drag performer and from that time on lived as a woman. A whole range of work followed, including snake-work, hula dancing and prostitution. Carmen never formally worked at Les Girls but over the years did some guest spots. She described how local police treated her: "I was locked up in Long Bay about a dozen times. But it made me a stronger person today."

Police v Rupe 
In 1966, Rupe was arrested while waiting for a taxi after a night out, charged by the police for 'frequenting with felonious intent' because she was wearing women's clothing. Despite misgendering Rupe, the case was a landmark one for the trans community, as Judge McCarthy ruled that he was "unable to find anything in our law which says that it is unlawful for a male to attire himself in female clothing."

Autobiography 
In 1988 an autobiography was published, outlining her escapades "from school boy to successful business woman". Carmen: My Life was written with Paul Martin and published by Benton Ross.

Politics

In Wellington Carmen ran Carmen's International Coffee Lounge and the Balcony strip club. Despite the law criminalising homosexual acts, Carmen challenged the overt discrimination and prejudice against people in the gay and transgender communities. She was not afraid to speak to the press and was summoned to appear before the Privileges Committee by Prime Minister Robert Muldoon for suggesting some MPs were gay or bisexual.

In 1977 she ran for the Wellington mayoralty, with the support of local businessman Sir Bob Jones, with the slogans get in behind and Carmen for mayor and a platform of gay marriage and legalised brothels, though neither of these are local-government matters in New Zealand. Michael Fowler won re-election as Mayor.

Last years
Rupe returned to Surry Hills, Sydney where she lived the remainder of her life. In 2003 she was inducted into the Variety Hall of Fame. In 2008 she rode her mobility scooter topless at the head of the Decade of the Divas float at the Gay and Lesbian Mardi Gras. She was a prominent member of Agender, the New Zealand transgender group.

Rupe died of kidney failure in St Vincent's Hospital, Sydney, on 15 December 2011, after a fall and hip surgery earlier in the year; she was 75.

Legacy

Rupe has been cited as a role model by MP Georgina Beyer, the world's first openly transgender Member of Parliament. Long-time friend and ex Grey District councillor Jacquie Grant wrote a tribute for Rupe and at her tangi delivered a eulogy.

In a tribute, the lord mayor of Sydney, Clover Moore, stated that:

Carmen Rupe was an icon for Sydney's Transgender community and a tireless advocate for GLBT rights. She was a quiet achiever who spent decades as a volunteer with many organisations who provided support to some of our cities most vulnerable people. I knew Carmen and was saddened by her passing. She will be missed by the people she touched and the community she was such a strong part of. It is heartening that, in accordance with her wishes, the Carmen Rupe Memorial Trust has been established to raise awareness of some of the issues faced by our GLBT community. This is a fitting tribute to someone who dedicated so much of their life to helping others.

Former Wellington Mayor Celia Wade-Brown, stated support for erecting a statue of Rupe in Wellington: "I admired her strength in living her life on her terms and standing up against discrimination."

Four sets of traffic lights along Cuba Street in Wellington's central business district are fitted with green pedestrial lights depicting Rupe. The lights were installed in August 2016 to coincide with the 30th anniversary of the Homosexual Law Reform Act.

In 2020, the short film GURL was released based on Rupe's life. The short film was a prequel to the feature film The Book of Carmen, which is currently in pre-production. The film was directed, produced and written by Mika X.

References

External links 

 Drag Star Carmen laid to rest " the Social Shuttle
 Obituary: Carmen Rupe by Jacquie Grant. 15 December 2011
 Eulogy: Carmen Rupe by Jacquie Grant. 21 December 2011
 Audio related to Carmen Rupe, interviews and remembrance,  PrideNZ.com
 Memories Of Carmen Rupe – Facebook Memorial Page
 '' Full version of the eulogy delivered by Jacquie Grant MNZM
 Carmen Rupe Memorial Trust – Facebook Page
 Carmen Rupe Transgender Icon: Rest In Peace
Dictionary of New Zealand Biography essay, published 2018

1936 births
2011 deaths
Deaths from kidney failure
Australian LGBT rights activists
New Zealand LGBT rights activists
New Zealand brothel owners and madams
New Zealand drag queens
New Zealand Māori activists
New Zealand Māori people
New Zealand Māori women
New Zealand military personnel
Ngāti Hāua people
Ngāti Maniapoto people
People from Taumarunui
Transgender female models
Transgender women
Transgender drag performers
21st-century LGBT people